The 2021–22 South Dakota Coyotes women's basketball represented the University of South Dakota in the 2021–22 NCAA Division I women's basketball season. The Coyotes were led by sixth-year head coach Dawn Plitzuweit and competed in the Summit League. They played home games in Sanford Coyote Sports Center in Vermillion, South Dakota. The Coyotes finished the season 29–6, sharing the Summit League regular season championship with South Dakota State, earning a 17–1 conference record. After winning the 2021–22 Summit League tournament, South Dakota received an automatic bid to the 2022 NCAA Division I women's basketball tournament. Surprising Ole Miss, the Coyotes upset 2nd seeded Baylor to advance to the Sweet Sixteen for the school's first time.

This was Plitzuweit's last season at USD. Shortly after the season, she left for the head coaching vacancy at West Virginia.

Roster

Schedule

|-
!colspan=9 style=| Non-conference regular season (5-6)

|-
!colspan=9 style=| Summit League regular season (17-1)

|-
!colspan=12 style=| Summit League

|-
!colspan=12 style=| NCAA tournament

Rankings
2021–22 NCAA Division I women's basketball rankings

References

South Dakota Coyotes women's basketball seasons
South Dakota
South Dakota Coyotes women's basketball
South Dakota Coyotes women's basketball
South Dakota